Jared Scott Gilmore (born May 30, 2000) is an American actor, voice actor and Twitch streamer. He is best known for his role in the series Once Upon a Time as Henry Mills.

Early life
Jared Scott Gilmore was born on May 30, 2000, in San Diego, California. For two years, he attended John Robert Powers San Diego, a training school for actors, models, and singers. According to Variety, Gilmore unintentionally began his acting career after running into talent representatives who were interested in his twin sister, Taylor. After many auditions, he acquired his first jobs through modeling T-shirts and acting in commercials. In an interview with the Los Angeles Times, Gilmore said, “Entering the film industry at a young age gave me a chance to mature and get a level of professionalism that is extremely helpful in our world. It’s an amazing experience being in the entertainment industry. I’m given a chance to influence people and help people in any way, shape, or form and it’s incredible.”

Acting career
Before being cast as Henry Mills in Once Upon a Time, Gilmore held minor roles in Roommates, Wilfred, Without a Trace, Eleventh Hour, The Back-up Plan, and Hawthorne. In 2009, he was cast as Bobby Draper in Mad Men. He was the third actor to play the character, after Maxwell Huckabee and Aaron Hart.

In 2011, Jared left Mad Men and was cast in Once Upon a Time as Henry Mills, the adopted son of Regina Mills and biological son of Emma Swan. Series creators Adam Horowitz and Eddy Kitsis stated of the role, "One of our emotional centers was an 11-year-old boy who had to be precocious and vulnerable at the same time." Kitsis believed that Gilmore "naturally brought [these characteristics] out... We just knew he had to be our Henry!" Gilmore commented, "I relate to Henry, because I'm 11 and also have a very good imagination. I enjoy making up and playing games in worlds with alternate realities myself."

At the 33rd Young Artist Awards, he won the Award for Best Performance in a TV Series – Leading Young Actor. The following year, at the 34th Young Artist Awards, he was nominated for Best Performance in a TV Series – Leading Young Actor. He was also included among the cast of Mad Men when it won the Screen Actors Guild Award for Outstanding Performance by an Ensemble in a Drama Series in 2010 for season 3. Since his appearance in the series finale of Once Upon a Time, which aired in May 2018, Gilmore has retreated from the acting scene. His last known role was in 2019 as the character Shalio in the English dub of Code Geass Lelouch of the Re;surrection, which is his debut into voiceover. Gilmore is stepping away from on-camera acting to pursue a voice acting career.

Personal life
In March 2019, Gilmore was signed to the Overwatch League team Atlanta Reign as a streamer, under the handle "CowboyBeBAMF". After leaving Atlanta Reign, Gilmore was signed to the Overwatch Contenders team Skyfoxes. Since then, he has streamed on the platform Twitch under the revised handle "Nightingale_Styx". Gilmore currently lives with his girlfriend Freya and their cat Angel.

Filmography

Film

Television

Awards and nominations

References

External links

2000 births
21st-century American male actors
American male child actors
American male film actors
American male television actors
American male voice actors
Living people
Male actors from San Diego
Twitch (service) streamers